Baden was a village on the eastern shore of the Kuchurhan Liman.  It is now part of the Ukrainian  village of Kuchurhan in Rozdilna Raion of Odesa Oblast. 

The village was established in 1808 by Roman Catholic German immigrants to the Kutschurgan Valley, then part of the Russian Empire.  It was located south of the German village of Straßburg and north of Selz (present-day Lymass'ke).  The remaining German residents were driven from the area by the advancing Soviet army in 1944.

See also
 Flight and evacuation of German civilians during the end of World War II

External links
 Baden Village Information
 Kutschurgan Map
 Founders of the Village of Baden

Populated places established in 1808
Villages in Rozdilna Raion
1808 establishments in Ukraine